Bugiri General Hospital, also Bugiri District Hospital, or Bugiri Hospital, is a hospital in the Eastern Region of Uganda.

Location
The coordinates of Bugiri General Hospital are: 0°34'25.0"N, 33°44'33.0"E (Latitude:0.573605; Longitude:33.742501).

Overview
Bugiri General Hospital is a 100-bed, government-owned hospital. It serves Bugiri District and parts of the districts of Iganga, Busia, Namayingo  Mayuge and Namutumba.

The hospital was built in 1967 by the Obote I government. Over the years, the hospital infrastructure has deteriorated, the equipment has become antiquated and hospital has become under-staffed. The remaining workers are overworked, underpaid, poorly funded and under-motivated.

Renovations
In November 2015,the Uganda Ministry of Health contracted  Alliance Technical Services Limited to carry out repairs to the hospital at a budgeted sum of UGX:699,856,460. The repair work is expedience to conclude in August 2016.

See also
List of hospitals in Uganda

References

External links
 Website of Uganda Ministry of Health

Hospitals in Uganda
Bugiri District
Busoga
Eastern Region, Uganda